"Speaking in Tongues" is the fifth single from indie rock band Arcade Fire's third album, The Suburbs. It did not appear on the original track listing, but showed up on the deluxe edition as a bonus track.

There is a direct reference to T.S Eliot's The Waste Land: "Hypocrite reader, my double, my brother", himself quoting Baudelaire's To the Reader: 
"— Hypocrite lecteur, — mon semblable, — mon frère!"

The title itself is a reference to the Bible (Acts 2:4 ; 1 Corinthians 14:18) to a phenomenon called glossolalia, which is believed to be a divine language unknown to the speaker. It is also a reference to the 1983 album of the same name by Talking Heads, the former band of guest singer David Byrne.

Credits and personnel
 Win Butler – lead vocals, guitar
 Régine Chassagne – backing vocals, drums
 David Byrne – backing vocals
 Richard Reed Parry – guitar, string arrangements
 Tim Kingsbury – bass
 William Butler – keyboards, guitar
 Sarah Neufeld – violin, backing vocals, string arrangements
 Jeremy Gara – drums
 Owen Pallett – string arrangements
 Marika Anthony Shaw – string arrangements
 Arcade Fire and Markus Dravs – producers
 Craig Silvey and Nick Launay – mixing

Chart performance

References

External links
 Official website

2011 singles
Arcade Fire songs
2010 songs
Mercury Records singles
Songs written by William Butler (musician)
Songs written by Win Butler
Songs written by Régine Chassagne
Songs written by Jeremy Gara
Songs written by Tim Kingsbury
Songs written by Richard Reed Parry